Geopolitics is a peer-reviewed academic journal covering global politics, human geography, and international political economy. It was established in 1996 and is published by Routledge.

Editors-in-chief
The current editor-in-chief is Reece Jones (University of Hawaiʻi at Mānoa).

Previous editors-in-chief are:

Abstracting and indexing
The journal is abstracted and indexed in:

According to the Journal Citation Reports, the journal has a 2020 impact factor of 4.117.

References

External links

Political science journals
Geography journals
Publications established in 1996
English-language journals
Routledge academic journals
5 times per year journals